The Crumpled Horn is a Grade II listed pub in Eldene, an eastern suburb of Swindon, Wiltshire, England. It was designed by Roy Wilson-Smith on the theme of the nursery rhyme "This Is the House That Jack Built" and built in 1975.

The Crumpled Horn received notoriety after being the scene of gangland violence on Friday 10 March 2023 when three people armed with machetes entered the pub to carry out a targeted attack.

The Crumpled Horn was the subject of a closure order issued by Swindon Magistrates, on the request of Wiltshire Police, issued on Tuesday 14 March 2023 after the landlady,  Jane Jeapes, was implicated in facilitating the sale and distribution of drugs from the premises.

References 

Buildings and structures completed in 1975
Buildings and structures in Swindon
Grade II listed pubs in Wiltshire
Pubs in Wiltshire